Félix Benoist (15 April 1818, Saumur – 1896, Nantes) was a French painter and lithographer. Some of his works are in the Pushkin Museum in Moscow.

References

19th-century French painters
French male painters
1818 births
1896 deaths
French lithographers
People from Saumur
19th-century French male artists